The 2021 Bathurst 1000 (known as the 2021 Repco Bathurst 1000 for commercial reasons) was a motor racing event for Supercars held on the week of 30 November to 5 December 2021. It was held at the Mount Panorama Circuit in Bathurst, New South Wales, Australia and featured a single 1000 kilometre race. The event was the final race of the 2021 Supercars Championship and the first time that Genuine Parts Company served as the naming rights sponsor.

Report

Background
The event was the 64th running of the Bathurst 1000, which was first held at the Phillip Island Grand Prix Circuit in 1960 as a 500-mile race for Australian-made standard production sedans, and marks the 61st time that the race was held at Mount Panorama. It was the 25th running of the Australian 1000 race, which was first held after the organisational split between the Australian Racing Drivers Club and V8 Supercars Australia that saw two "Bathurst 1000" races contested in both 1997 and 1998. 

It was the first time in its history that the event took place during December, as well as it becoming a week long round.

Shane van Gisbergen and Garth Tander were the defending race winners, they continued to race in the same car.

Entry list 
Twenty-five cars entered the event - 17 Holden Commodores and eight Ford Mustangs. In addition to the 24 regular entries, a single wildcard entry was entered from Triple Eight Race Engineering, for Russell Ingall and Broc Feeney (who were, respectively, the oldest and youngest drivers on the grid). Zak Best was the only driver to make his debut in the race for Tickford Racing.

Entries with a grey background are wildcard entries which do not compete in the full championship season.

Results

Practice

Qualifying

Top Ten Shootout

Grid

Race

Notes

References

Bathurst 1000
Motorsport in Bathurst, New South Wales
Bathurst 1000